The Central Ohio Subdivision is owned by CSX Transportation and operated by Columbus and Ohio River Railroad in the U.S. State of Ohio. At its west end the line continues east from the Columbus and Ohio River Railroad C&N Subdivision and at its east end the line comes to an end.

See also
 List of CSX Transportation lines

References

Rail infrastructure in Ohio